Pseudosolanderia is a genus of cnidarians belonging to the monotypic family Pseudosolanderiidae.

Species:

Pseudosolanderia picardi 
Pseudosolanderia sagamina

References

Capitata
Hydrozoan genera